This is a list of Japanese comedians—known in Japanese as  ,  , or simply  —and their group names. This page uses the word "comedian" in its broadest possible sense. For more information on modern Japanese comedy, see owarai. Names on this page are listed in English alphabetical order according to family name or group name, where applicable.

For a list of Japanese comedians by their year of debut, see List of Japanese comedians by year of debut.

!–9
 
 130R
 
 
 2Chokenju

A
 
 
 
 
 
 
 
 
 
 
 
 
 
 
 
 
 
 
 
 
 
 
 
 AMEMIYA

B

C
 
 
 
 
 
 
 
 
 
 
 
 
 
 
 
 
 
 
 
 
 
 
 
 
 
 
 
 
 
 
 Cowcow

D

E
 
 
 
 EXIT

F
 
 
 
 
 
 
 
 FUJIWARA

G
 
 
 
 
 
 
 
 
 
 
 
 
 
 

H

I

J

K

L

M

N

O

P

R

S

T
 
 
 
 
 
 
 
 
 
 
 
 
 TIM
 
 
 TKO

U

V

W

X
 X-GUN

Y
 
 
 
 
 
 
 
 
 HIRO

Z

See also

List of Japanese celebrities
List of Japanese people
List of Japanese comedians by year of debut

References

Japanese
Comedians